Zoombezi Bay is a  water park owned by the Columbus Zoo and Aquarium near Powell, Ohio just north of Columbus.  The park sits on the site of the former Wyandot Lake Adventure Park, which was purchased by the Columbus Zoo and Aquarium in 2006. Zoombezi Bay opened to the public on May 26, 2008, and currently ranks as one of the Midwest's most popular water parks, attracting more than 400,000 visitors annually.

History

Wyandot Lake

Wyandot Lake originally began as a picnic and recreational park in 1896. In the 1940s, the area was purchased by a carnival operator to be used as winter storage for the carnival's rides. The area soon developed into an amusement park. In 1956, the Jet Flyer was added as the park's first roller coaster; (later known as the Sea Dragon). Following the park owner's death in the 1970s, ownership was transferred to the City of Columbus, which leased the property to Ohio-based Funtime, Inc. in 1983. Construction soon began on Wyandot Lake Adventure Park, which officially opened on May 24, 1984. Funtime Inc. was then acquired by Premier Parks in 1995. Premier Parks, originally an Oklahoma-based real estate company named TierCo, ventured into the entertainment industry when it purchased the Frontier City theme park in 1983. It later acquired Six Flags in 1999, and changed its name to Six Flags Inc.

Under new ownership, the amusement park continued to operate under the name Wyandot Lake. However, by 2003, Six Flags began experiencing financial difficulties, and began the process to sell multiple properties. In June 2006, the Columbus Zoo and Aquarium announced that it had entered an agreement with Six Flags to purchase Wyandot Lake for $2 million, which would be finalized later in the year. Six Flags – struggling with annual losses since 1999 – was eager to negotiate with the nearby zoo amid city plans to realign Powell Road, which would cut through a portion of Wyandot Lake. Shortly thereafter, the Zoo announced plans to invest nearly $45 million to substantially re-develop the former Wyandot Lake property. Officials projected that by expanding Wyandot Lake and operating it in tandem with the zoo, both facilities would become substantially more attractive, with the potential to  produce more than $1.3 million in annual profit.

Wyandot Lake included both a dry amusement park area, as well as a full waterpark. Among the highlights of the amusement park was the Mangels-Illions Grand Carousel. The carousel was one of only a few manufactured by the William F. Mangels Company with wooden horses carved by M.C. Illions and Sons. In 1999, the carousel was removed from Wyandot Lake and underwent a one million dollar restoration before being moved to the Columbus Zoo and Aquarium.

Wyandot Lake's Wild Tides Wave Pool had a maximum depth of 9 feet.

Substantial portions of the former amusement park were incorporated into the Zoo, becoming Jungle Jack's Landing, Animal Encounters Village, and Colo's Cove Picnic Grove areas. An expanded parking lot and new entry plaza were also constructed, and a  parcel on the corner of Powell Road and Riverside Drive was set aside for a new water park.

Reconstruction

In October 2006, work began to remove the former picnic area and clear trees and other out-dated rides. Many older attractions and equipment were auctioned off. Wyandot Lake's popular "Jet Stream" and "Zuma Falls" water slides were purchased for $500 by The Beach Water Park, located in Mason, Ohio.

During the summer of 2007, an online contest was held to name the new water park. More than 3,000 people voted, and the name Zoombezi Bay was selected from a list that also included Kisawa Waves, Katoomba Lagoon, Kahuna Island, and Tahiti Waves.

By the time the park re-opened as Zoombezi Bay on May 26, 2008, only two attractions from the former Wyandot Lake remained within the water park. Christopher's Island was refurbished and renamed Barracuda Bay (2008-2013), while Canoochee Creek was renamed Croctail Creek and now serves as the park's adults-only lazy river. The park's former classic Sea Dragon roller coaster still stands along the park's perimeter, now serving as the signature attraction of the zoo's Rides At Adventure Cove area. Other former Wyandot Lake buildings can still be seen standing around the park's perimeter, but are now separated from the water park by fences and landscaping.

Growth and Expansion
On December 5, 2010, during the Columbus Zoo and Aquarium's annual Jack Hanna's Into the Wildlights holiday television special, Columbus Zoo Executive Director Dale Schmidt announced Zoombezi Bay's first major expansion, which included the addition of two new water slides from manufacturer WhiteWater West. Both attractions opened to the public on May 21, 2011.

For the 2014 season, Zoombezi Bay announced that it would be retiring an attraction that represented childhood memories for many Central Ohioans. After 17 years of entertaining guests, Barracuda Bay (formerly Christopher's Island) was demolished to make room for an all-new, highly themed AquaPlay RainFortress from WhiteWater West. The new addition represented a $4.5 million investment for the property, making it one of the largest in the park's history. Baboon Lagoon opened to the public on May 17, 2014, and would go on to win an award for Best New Product in Themed Exhibit Design from the International Association of Amusement Parks and Attractions.

The highest attendance number that Zoombezi Bay ever achieved was in 2016 with 426,376 guests. The busiest month in Zoombezi Bay's history was also in 2016 – when the waterpark welcomed 161,534 visitors in the month of June.

For the 2016 season, Zoombezi Bay transformed its former Tahitian Twister slide (which opened with the park in 2008) to a new slide, now known as the Soundsurfer, "The King of Beats". This new attraction features colorful LED lights, and also plays music that guests choose at the top of the tower before getting on the slide. The slide also went through a re-paint, and the slides new colors are orange and white, instead of the former colors, blue and black. These new features make this slide the first of its kind in America.

Attractions

Current Attractions

Former Wyandot Lake Attractions

Theme Song
The Zoombezi Bay theme song "Zoombezi Bay" was written and produced by freelance musician Kelly Warner from Columbus, Ohio.  Vocals were performed by Nachilus Kezuck and Brian O'Dell.

References

External links
Official site
About.com info about the park.
Columbus Zoo & Aquarium

Buildings and structures in Delaware County, Ohio
Economy of Columbus, Ohio
Former Six Flags theme parks
Tourist attractions in Delaware County, Ohio
Water parks in Ohio
2008 establishments in Ohio
Funtime, Inc.